Alfred De Busschere (15 November 1891 – 3 April 1977) was a Belgian racing cyclist. He rode in the 1922 Tour de France.

References

1891 births
1977 deaths
Belgian male cyclists
Place of birth missing